Swedish Fish is a fish-shaped, chewy candy originally developed by Swedish candy producer Malaco in the late 1950s for the U.S. market. They come in a variety of colors and flavors.

Ingredients 
Swedish Fish contains:
 Sugar
 Invert sugar
 Corn syrup
 Modified corn starch
 Citric acid
 Natural and artificial flavors
 White mineral oil
 Carnauba wax (Manufactured in Canada) or  Beeswax (Manufactured in Turkey)
 Red (Dye) #40
 Yellow (Dye) #6
 Yellow (Dye) #5
 Blue (Dye) #1
Previous wrappers advertised the product as being "a fat-free food". They are gluten-free.

Chemical properties 

One of the ingredients in Swedish Fish is invert sugar, a combination of glucose and fructose. Invert sugar is important in Swedish Fish due to its ability to retain moisture.

Swedish Fish contain modified cornstarch which is used primarily to form its shape. It is utilized as a medium in trays when the product is put in them to be molded. In addition, white mineral oil is added to these trays to supplement the starch, prevent the candy from crumbling, and give it a shiny coating.

Carnauba wax is used in Swedish Fish as a coating and gives the candy a waxy texture.

Citric acid also adds to the product's shelf life.

In Sweden 

In Sweden, a large share of confectionery sales are sold as pick and mix. Wine gums are sold in many different shapes, of which fish is just one. The Swedish Fish candy is marketed under the name "pastellfiskar", literally "pastel fish", and under the Malaco brand among others. The fish-shaped candies are also part of a Malaco bag of mixed candy called Gott&blandat. This popular candy bag was introduced in 1979 and over the years many variations of it has been made.

In North America 

Today the Swedish Fish consumed in North America are made in Hamilton, Ontario, Canada, and Turkey by Mondelēz International. In Canada, Swedish Fish are distributed under Mondelez International's Maynards Bassetts brand.

The fish are distributed in the U.S. by Mondelēz International. The fish-shaped candy gained enough popularity on its own to where the Malaco, and later Cadbury, company had to do little advertising for the product, until this past decade. A recent resurgence in popularity has resulted in greater accessibility in supermarkets and convenience stores where they are often sold prepackaged in plastic bags. Building upon this resurgence, the company recently created "Giant Fish" television advertisements and a "Treadin' Water" YouTube mini-series, which follows the miscellaneous adventures of four friends and a Giant Swedish Fish sharing an apartment. The first few episodes of the mini-series were published onto YouTube on May 9, 2016.

Originally colored red with a flavor unique to the candy (often guessed to be lingonberry, but never verified), they are now also available in several different colors, such as Orange & Lemon-Lime. Purple Swedish Fish in grape flavor were discontinued in 2006. The fish come in two different sizes. Initially, the smaller fish came only in red; now fish of both sizes are available in all flavors. According to a visit to the factory on the Food Network's show Unwrapped, green is not lime, but pineapple flavor, while yellow is a lemon-lime flavor.

History 
Although well known in the U.S., Swedish Fish were only launched on the U.S. market in the late 1950s. The original owner of these candies was the Swedish company Malaco, which wanted to expand its sales to North America and entered partnership with Cadbury. Wanting to create a product that reflected the culture of Sweden in some way, a fish-shaped gummy candy was created. Fishing was and is still a large part of Sweden's culture, and fish is a considerable part of the Swedish diet. Mondelez distributes the candy in the U.S. today, but the fish gummies are still distributed by Malaco in Sweden.

Partnerships 
In 2009, Rita's Italian Ice, a U.S. chain which serves Italian ice and frozen custard, introduced a red Swedish Fish flavored Italian ice as a cobranded product.

Trident, a gum company owned by Mondelez Global, produced a Swedish Fish flavored product, which is advertised as "Berry + Lemon" flavor.

In 2016, Nabisco created a test-market product Swedish Fish Oreos, available at Kroger grocery stores in the US.

References

External links 
 The Original Swedish Fish website, run by Cadbury Adams

Cadbury Adams brands
Brand name confectionery
Products introduced in 1958
Fish in human culture
Candy
Mondelez International brands
Swedish confectionery